Gadira leucophthalma, commonly known as the beaked moss moth, is a moth in the family Crambidae. It is endemic to New Zealand. It is found in the south eastern side of the South Island down to Banks  Peninsula. G. leucophthalma inhabits the foredunes of coastal areas. The larval host is unknown but it has been hypothesised that the larvae feed on moss. The adult moths are day flying although some specimens have been trapped at night via light traps. Adults are commonly on the wing from March to April. This species has been classified as Nationally Vulnerable by the Department of Conservation.

Taxonomy 
This species was first described by Edward Meyrick in 1882 from specimens collected in the Port Hills near Lyttelton and named Thinasotia leucophthalma. Thinasotia was a misspelling by Meyrick of the genus Thisanotia. Meyrick gave a more detailed description of the species in 1883. In 1895 George Hampson placed this species within the genus Talis. This placement was followed by Meyrick in 1913, George Vernon Hudson in 1928, and in 1930 by Alfred Philpott, who studied the male genitalia of the species. In 1973 David E. Gaskin assigned the species to the genus Gadira. The lectotype specimen of this moth is held at the Natural History Museum, London.

Description 

Meyrick described this species as follows:

This species is visually very similar to Gadira petraula but it can be distinguished as G. leucophthalma is slightly larger and the edges of its forewings are more lightly coloured. Both G. leucophthalma male and females have variable colour patternation on their wings. The females have variable wing length.

Distribution 

G. leucophthalma is endemic to New Zealand. It is found south eastern side in the South Island on the   Along with its type location of Lyttelton hills, this species has also been collected on Mount Gray, on Kaitorete Spit, and on Banks Peninsula, all in Canterbury. G. leucophthalma is also recorded as being present at Cloudy Bay.

Biology and behaviour 
Meyrick originally collected adults of the species in March but subsequently took it in December. Specimens have also been collected in November. However it is more commonly seen from March to April. The species is a day flying moth although some specimens have been trapped at night with UV light.

Habitat 
G. leucophthalma prefers to inhabit foredunes. The species has also been found to inhabit areas of bristle-grass with moss present.

Host plants 
The host plants of this species is unknown although it has been hypothesised that the larvae feed on moss.

Conservation Status 
This species has the "Nationally Vulnerable" conservation status under the New Zealand Threat Classification System.

References

Crambinae
Moths described in 1882
Moths of New Zealand
Taxa named by Edward Meyrick
Endemic fauna of New Zealand
Endangered biota of New Zealand
Endemic moths of New Zealand